Amonkar is a surname. Notable people with the surname include: 

Guru Amonkar, Indian cricketer
Kishori Amonkar (1932–2017), Indian classical vocalist
Ravindra Amonkar (born 1950), Indian director
Sumiran Amonkar (born 1991), Indian cricketer
Suresh Amonkar (1952–2020), Indian politician
Suresh Gundu Amonkar (1935–2019), Indian educationist